The Boss Baby: Back in Business is an American computer-animated comedy streaming television series produced by DreamWorks Animation. It serves as a follow-up to the 2017 film The Boss Baby, loosely based on the book of the same name by Marla Frazee. The series premiered on Netflix on April 6, 2018. JP Karliak voices the title character, replacing Alec Baldwin, while Pierce Gagnon replaces Miles Bakshi as Tim Templeton; only Eric Bell Jr. reprised his role from the film, returning as The Triplets. The fourth and final season premiered on November 17, 2020.

Summary
The series takes place in the late 1970s somewhere in the Midwestern United States, between the first and second film. In season one, Boss Baby and Tim work around the world of Baby Corp to stop the company's new enemy, Bootsy Calico, a businessman and former vet, who has control over kittens. Boss Baby also deals with his boss, Mega Fat CEO Baby, who keeps trying to fire him. In the end, Calico surrenders and is arrested, while Mega Fat is fired after striking a deal with Bootsy.

In season two, Boss Baby deals with a new enemy, Frederick Estes and the Consortium of Ancients, when his new boss, Turtleneck Superstar CEO Baby, tasks him with protecting Baby Corp's new product, Stinkless Serum, which can eliminate bad odors forever. In the end, after becoming CEO, Boss Baby takes down Estes and Turtleneck Superstar, after she reveals herself to be an old woman guilty of espionage in BabyCorp for the Consortium of Ancients, and they both are arrested.

In season three, Boss Baby is fired when the board of directors think he is the reason why Baby Corp has many enemies. Boss Baby decides to work with other babies who are in his new playgroup, including a reformed Mega Fat, to get his job back. Meanwhile, Staci and Jimbo, Boss Baby's co-workers and friends, deal with multiple CEOs that get hired and fired quickly. Later, Boss Baby later decides to shut down Bubbezee, a company that makes products to keep babies safe, but makes them unhappy, unbeknownst to the parents. Boss Baby then finds out that the CEO of Bubbezee is Happy Sedengry, a businessman who earlier faked a job as a baby communicator, or Babblist, and tried to tear the playgroup apart using his fraud. In the end, Boss Baby takes down Sedengry, who is arrested, and the board of directors rehires him, as CEO.

In season four, rehired and promoted to CEO, Boss Baby plans to gain 100% of the world's love, but begins to face new challenges: an all-new dog operated Puppy Co, who are renting a part of Baby Corp's office while plotting against Boss Baby, TV exotic pet sensations Pyg and Tam, who are trying to push Baby Corp into letting them buy the company headquarters so they can turn it into a studio, and OCB, a consultant baby who wants Boss Baby's job. Meanwhile, Tim adjusts as his best friend, Danny Petrosky is moving due to his paranoid father believing the government found him. After suffering crushing defeats, in the end, Boss Baby finally defeats all three enemies. Pyg, Tam, and Maria–Maria end up in the jail, OCB and his fan, a previous CEO, end up in a playground, and the puppies end up in a room where they are surrounded by vacuum cleaners. Boss Baby then retires, and promotes Staci as CEO, and Tim sings his "Bro Jam" with Danny. Upon Boss Baby's retirement, he willingly turns himself into a normal baby, as earlier in the season Boss Baby's parents became concerned with his apparent lack of growth. This led Tim and Boss Baby to reconcile with the fact that he must move forward and grow up. In the end, Tim sheds a tear but promises Boss Baby, Theodore Lindsay Templeton, that he will watch over him.

Cast

 JP Karliak as Theodore Lindsey "Ted" Templeton Jr. /  The Boss Baby
 Pierce Gagnon as Timothy Leslie "Tim" Templeton
 David W. Collins as Ted Templeton Sr.
 Hope Levy as Janice Templeton
 Kevin Michael Richardson as Jimbo and Buddy from HR
 Alex Cazares as Staci
 Eric Bell Jr. as The Triplets
 Jake Green as Bootsy Calico (season 1) and Donald (season 3)
 Nora Dunn as Gigi (season 2)
 Diedrich Bader as Junior Fancy (season 2 and 4)
 Cynthia Erivo as Turtleneck Superstar (season 2)
 Victor Raider-Wexler as Frederic Estes (season 2)
 Flula Borg as Mega Fat and Officer Doug
 Sarah-Nicole Robles as Marisol
 David Lodge as Magnus
 Aparna Nacherla as Frankie
 Justin Felbinger as Danny Petrosky
 Audrey Huynh as Gina and Tina Namashita (season 3 and 4)
 Aasif Mandvi as OCB (season 4)
 Carla Tassara as Maria–Maria (season 4)
 Dan Bakkedahl as Scary Sweary (season 3)
 Rhys Darby as Happy Sedengry (season 3)
 James Patrick Stuart as Wagby (season 3)
 Bridget Everett as Rattleshake (season 3)
 Cheri Oteri as Multi-Multi-Task (season 3)
 Joel Kim Booster as Travis Le Duque (season 3)
 Regi Davis as Dr. Kevin (season 3)
 Eric Lopez as Hermano Menor (season 3 and 4)
 Brandon Scott as Manager Baby Hendershot
 Kari Wahlgren as Marsha Krinkle & R&D Baby Simmons

Episodes

Season 1 (2018)

Season 2 (2018)

Season 3 (2020)

Special (2020)

Season 4 (2020)

Release
The series premiered its first season on Netflix in the US on April 6, 2018. The second season was released October 12, 2018. The third season was released on March 16, 2020. An interactive special titled as "The Boss Baby: Get That Baby!" was released on September 1, 2020. The fourth season was released on November 17, 2020.

Awards and nominations

References

External links 
 
 

2010s American animated television series
2010s American workplace comedy television series
2018 American television series debuts
2020s American animated television series
2020s American workplace comedy television series
2020 American television series endings
American children's animated comedy television series
American computer-animated television series
Interquel television series
Animated television series about children
Animated television shows based on films
The Boss Baby (franchise)
English-language Netflix original programming
Netflix children's programming
Television series based on adaptations
Television series by DreamWorks Animation
Television series by Universal Television